"All Those Yesterdays", song by Pearl Jam from Yield (album)
"All Those Yesterdays", (Justin Tubb) from The Importance of Being Ernest
"All Those Yesterdays", (Hanson, Heeney, Masters) from Jennifer Hanson (album)